Nintendo World Cup is a soccer video game for the Family Computer/NES and Game Boy, developed by Technōs Japan and released in 1990. It is a localization of  the fourth Kunio-kun game released for the Family Computer. Ports for the PC Engine and Mega Drive were also released in Japan. A Game Boy version was released in Japan, North America, and Europe.

Plot

Nekketsu High School Dodgeball Club: Soccer
Eight students known as Atsushi, Genei, Hiroyuki, Kunio, Masa, Masahiro, Susumu and Takashi compete in a soccer tournament against 13 other high schools.

Nintendo World Cup
Thirteen national teams compete in a world cup to become number 1. At the time of the game's release, the German team represented West Germany, with the East German team reunifying with West Germany later on in 1990.

 (West Germany)

Gameplay

At its core, the game follows the rules of football, but with noticeable differences. Each team has only six players (a goalkeeper, two defenders, a midfielder and two forwards). You control only one of them, but you can give commands (Pass/Shoot) to the others. Offsides are non-existent and fouls are not punished. Players can be knocked out by repeatedly sliding, tackling or shooting them, afterwards they will stay down for the rest of the half. Players can also use up to five "super shots" per half; these powerful, odd-looking shots are used whenever a player does a bicycle kick or most of the time when doing a diving header, or when he shoots after walking a certain number of steps. The "super shots" differ from team to team. The playing fields also differ in respect to material, e.g. ice, which heavily impacts movement of players and the ball.

There are two game modes:
Tournament mode, in which one or two players take control of one of the 13 available teams, in order to defeat their CPU-controlled opponents.
VS Match mode, which enables players to confront each other on sand, ice or dirt playing fields. On the NES version, up to four players can compete using the NES Four Score or the NES Satellite. For the Game Boy a link cable or Four Player Adapter would be used.

Graphically, the NES version game looks similar to the Famicom version and other games in the Kunio-kun series, particularly Downtown Nekketsu Story/River City Ransom, with its short-legged, big-headed characters with varied faces; in fact, some sprites, such as Kunio and the other members of the Japanese team, were reused from that game.

Regional differences
The NES version of Nekketsu High School Dodge Ball Club: Soccer Edition, Nintendo World Cup, differs from its counterpart, in that the game centers around a World Cup set in Japan between thirteen high schools, instead of a soccer tournament. In the main Tournament Mode, the player takes control of the main team of Nekketsu High School team and competes against the other twelve teams. The Tournament Mode's opening intro and story sequences are removed in the NES version. In the Famicom version's "Vs. Match Mode", the player can only choose between the Nekketsu team and four other teams. Since the main Tournament Mode in the Famicom version only featured a single team, the NES localization allows the player to choose between the thirteen nationalities represented in the game by changing the palette of the player's team and their super shots. Unlike the Famicom version, the NES version supports up to four players instead of two.

Ports

Game Boy

It was released in North America and Europe under the same name.

PC Engine CD

The game was ported to PC Engine's Super CD-ROM² and retitled  and was released on December 20, 1991, published by Naxat Soft.

This version includes five national teams (France, Brazil, Argentina, Italy and Germany) in Tournament mode which is after beating the final match.

PC Engine

A similar version for the PC Engine HuCard was released on April 13, 1992, under the title  Only differences between the two versions, the CD version has an arranged soundtrack and add voice acting for opening intro and cut scene, while the HuCard version has no voice acting, etc.

Mega Drive

A Mega Drive version of the game, titled  was released by Palsoft in Japan on August 7, 1992. Unlike the Famicom/NES version and other platforms, this version has all the teams playable in VS. Mode.

Game Boy Advance
The Famicom version of the game was ported to Game Boy Advance as the part of Kunio-kun Nekketsu Collection 2 (along with Downtown Nekketsu Kōshinkyoku: Soreyuke Daiundōkai), was released on October 27, 2005, in Japan.

Virtual Console
The original Famicom version of Nekketsu High School Dodgeball Club: Soccer Edition was re-released for Virtual Console in Japan on October 7, 2008, for the Wii and on March 19, 2014, for the Wii U. As for Nintendo World Cup, however, there are no plans for the game to be released in North America or PAL regions. The PC Engine Super CD-ROM² version of the game was also re-released in Japan for the Wii on November 4, 2008.

Switch & PS4
Nekketsu High School Dodgeball Club - Soccer Story was released as part of the compilation title DOUBLE DRAGON & Kunio-kun Retro Brawler Bundle for the Nintendo Switch and PlayStation 4 on February 20, 2020.

Notes

References

External links
 
Nekketsu High School Dodge Ball Club: Soccer Edition Virtual Console site 

1990 video games
1991 video games
1992 video games
Association football video games
High school-themed video games
Nintendo Entertainment System games
Game Boy games
TurboGrafx-CD games
TurboGrafx-16 games
Sega Genesis games
X68000 games
Kunio-kun
Technōs Japan games
Video games developed in Japan
Virtual Console games
Virtual Console games for Wii U